The H&BR Class F2 (LNER Class N12) was a class of 0-6-2T steam locomotives of the Hull and Barnsley Railway. It was designed by Matthew Stirling and nine locomotives were built by Kitson & Co. in 1901.

Equipment
The locomotives had domeless boilers and rounded cabs and were fitted with vacuum brakes. After the Grouping in 1923, they were rebuilt with a variety of boilers, some domed and some domeless.

Use
They were used for goods trains, banking, assembling mineral trains in colliery sidings and occasionally for passenger work.

Withdrawal
All but one were withdrawn between 1936 and 1938. The survivor passed to British Railways in 1948. It was allocated the BR number 69089, but never carried it, and was scrapped in August 1948. None of the class is preserved.

References

F2
0-6-2T locomotives
Kitson locomotives
Railway locomotives introduced in 1901
Standard gauge steam locomotives of Great Britain
Scrapped locomotives